The Kaohsiung Arena is an indoor sporting arena located in Zuoying District, Kaohsiung, Taiwan. It is used to host indoor sporting events. It was used as a host to some of the indoor sporting events during the 2009 World Games.

Name
Local people give the nickname of Kaohsiung Arena as the Big Egg due to its shape and resemblance of an egg.

History
Kaohsiung Arena was opened on 27 September 2008.

Architecture
Kaohsiung Arena covers an area of 57,037 m2 and has a capacity of 15,000 people. It stands to a height of 42 meters over 6 floors. It also features a 100,000 m2 open space adjacent to it.

Transportation
The venue is accessible within walking distance north of Kaohsiung Arena Station of Kaohsiung MRT.

See also
 List of stadiums in Taiwan

References

External links

Arena information 

2008 establishments in Taiwan
Indoor arenas in Taiwan
Sports venues completed in 2008
Sports venues in Kaohsiung
Zuoying District